This article is a list of seasons completed by the Atlanta Falcons American football franchise of the National Football League (NFL).

The Falcons did not record consecutive winning seasons until 2008–2012; the franchise won playoff games in back-to-back seasons for the first time in 2016–2017. They are one of two NFC South teams who have reached multiple Super Bowls in their history without winning any of them as of 2021; the other franchise with this tag is the Carolina Panthers.

Seasons

All-time records
Note: Statistics are correct .

Footnotes
The NFL expanded from a 14-game regular season schedule to 16 beginning in 1978.
The 1982 NFL season was shortened from 16 regular season games to 9 due to a players' strike. For playoff seedings, division standings were ignored and the league used a 16-team tournament format for the postseason.
The 1987 NFL season was shortened from 16 regular season games to 15 due to a players' strike.

References

External links

 
 

Seasons
 
Atlanta Falcons